Vanta may refer to:

Vantaa, a city in Finland
Nvidia Vanta, a graphics accelerator manufactured by Nvidia
Vertically aligned carbon nanotube arrays, an advanced material surface
Vanta, a song by the British progressive metal band Monuments.
Vantablack, the darkest black surface coating known